The term Archdiocese (or Archeparchy) of Baghdad may refer to several ecclesiastical jurisdictions in Baghdad, Iraq:

 Patriarchal Province of Seleucia-Ctesiphon, a historical archdiocese of the Church of the East, whose patriarchs resided in Baghdad from the 8th to the 13th century
 Eastern Orthodox Archdiocese of Baghdad
 In the Catholic Church:
 Armenian Catholic Archeparchy of Baghdad
 Chaldean Catholic Archeparchy of Baghdad
 Roman Catholic Archdiocese of Baghdad
 Syriac Catholic Archeparchy of Baghdad